This is the discography of American rapper and record producer Mannie Fresh.

Albums

Singles

As lead artist

As featured artist

Other charted songs

Guest appearances

See also 
 Big Tymers discography
 Cash Money Millionaires discography
 Mannie Fresh production discography

References

Hip hop discographies
Discographies of American artists